Henry Durant (1802–1875), founding president of the University of California

Henry Durant (bishop) (1871–1932), Anglican bishop
Henry Fowle Durant (1822–1881), founder of Wellesley College
Henry William Durant (1902–1982), British opinion pollster

See also
Henry Durand (disambiguation)